USS Sequoia has been the name of more than one United States Navy ship, and may refer to 

 , a presidential yacht purchased in 1931 and commissioned 1933, remaining in service until 1977; currently privately owned
 , a lightship in commission from 1917 to 1919

See also
 
 

United States Navy ship names